Senator Stamas may refer to:

Jim Stamas (born 1965), Michigan State Senate
Tony Stamas (born 1966), Michigan State Senate